Sorotacta is a genus of moth in the family Gelechiidae.

Species
 Sorotacta bryochlora Meyrick, 1922
 Sorotacta viridans Meyrick, 1914

References

Gelechiinae